United Nations Security Council resolution 793, adopted unanimously on 30 November 1992, after recalling resolutions 696 (1991), 747 (1992) and 785 (1992), and expressing its concern at the deteriorating political situation and the resumption of hostilities in Angola, the Council approved a recommendation by the Secretary-General Boutros Boutros-Ghali to extend the mandate of the United Nations Angola Verification Mission II (UNAVEM II) for a further two months until 31 January 1993.

The resolution appealed to the personnel contributing to UNAVEM II in order to restore as soon as possible its mandated strength, and welcomed the joint declaration of the Government of Angola and UNITA made in Namibe (today's Moçâmedes), urging both to take immediate and effective actions in accordance with the declaration.

The Council then condemned any resumption of hostilities and demanded that they cease immediately, further calling on all states to refrain from actions that could jeopardise the peace agreements signed. It called on both parties to meet their obligations under the "Acordos de Paz" (peace accord) with regard to the confinement of their troops, demobilisation, and the formation of the unified national armed forces, urging continuous dialogue throughout.

Finally, the resolution required the Secretary-General to submit a report on the situation in Angola together with long-term recommendations of UNAVEM II in the peace process by 31 January 1993.

See also
 Angolan Civil War
 Angolan legislative election, 1992
 Angolan presidential election, 1992
 List of United Nations Security Council Resolutions 701 to 800 (1991–1993)
 United Nations Angola Verification Mission III

References

External links
 
Text of the Resolution at undocs.org

 0793
1992 in Angola
Angolan Civil War
 0793
November 1992 events